The Kangnam Mountains are a mountain range of North Korea, in the central part of the country's northern region. They run parallel to the Amnok River which forms the border with China. They lie west of the Rangrim Mountains, which is the drainage divide between northwestern and northeastern Korea.  

Mountain ranges of North Korea